Padam Pokhari (पदमपोखरी) was a village development committee but now it is a part of Hetauda sub-metropolitan city in Makwanpur District in Bagmati Province of Central Nepal. At the time of the 1991 Nepal census, it had a population of 11,838 people living in 2073 individual households.
It is surrounded by Churiyamai and Hetauda to the east, Basamadi to the north, Handikhola to the west and Parsa district to the south.

References

Populated places in Makwanpur District